North Tea Lake is a lake in the Ottawa River drainage basin in the geographic townships of Ballantyne and Wilkes in the Unorganized South Part of Nipissing District in Northeastern Ontario, Canada. It is on the Amable du Fond River and lies in the northwest of Algonquin Provincial Park. The lake is a popular destination for canoeists.

The primary inflow is the Amable du Fond River arriving from Kawawaymog Lake at the west. The primary outflow is the Amable du Fond River, at the northeast to Manitou Lake, which flows via the Mattawa River to the Ottawa River.

Tributaries
"right" and "left" are with reference to the Amable du Fond River
Lorne Creek (left)
Cayuga Creek (right)
Amable du Fond River

See also
List of lakes in Ontario

References

External links

 Photos of the lake on Flickr

Lakes of Nipissing District